Richard Roelofsen (born 13 July 1969) is a Dutch former professional footballer who played as a striker.

Career
Roelofsen started his professional career in the 1988–89 season as part of PEC Zwolle. He since also appeared for Vitesse, MVV, Roda JC, NAC Breda, De Graafschap and Heracles Almelo. He announced his retirement from football in 2006.

On 20 February 2012, Roelofsen was appointed caretaker manager of De Graafschap after the resignation of former head coach Andries Ulderink. Roelofsen and De Graafschap since agreed on a contract extension for four seasons as of 1 July 2012, with him fully focusing on his job as assistant coach, with an extra focus on the personal development plans of players at De Graafschap.

Personal life
His nephew Marco Roelofsen also played football on the highest level in the Netherlands.

Honours
Zwolle
 Eerste Divisie: 2001–02

Heracles Almelo
 Eerste Divisie: 2004–05

References

1969 births
Living people
People from Harderwijk
Dutch footballers
Association football forwards
PEC Zwolle players
NAC Breda players
SBV Vitesse players
MVV Maastricht players
Roda JC Kerkrade players
De Graafschap players
Heracles Almelo players
Eredivisie players
Eerste Divisie players
Footballers from Gelderland
De Graafschap managers
VVOG players